Aldehyde dehydrogenase 3 family, member B1 also known as ALDH3B1 is an enzyme that in humans is encoded by the ALDH3B1 gene.

Function 

The aldehyde dehydrogenases are a family of isozymes that may play a major role in the detoxification of aldehydes generated by alcohol metabolism and lipid peroxidation. This particular gene spans about 20 kb of genomic DNA and is composed of 9 coding exons. The gene encodes a single transcript of 2.8 kb that is highly expressed in kidney and lung. The functional significance of this gene and the cellular localization of its product are presently unknown. Two transcript variants encoding different isoforms have been found for this gene.

Model organisms
Model organisms have been used in the study of ALDH3B1 function. A conditional knockout mouse line called Aldh3b1tm1b(EUCOMM)Wtsi was generated at the Wellcome Trust Sanger Institute. Male and female animals underwent a standardized phenotypic screen to determine the effects of deletion. Additional screens performed:  - In-depth immunological phenotyping - in-depth bone and cartilage phenotyping

References

External links

Further reading